Neoregelia cathcartii is a species of flowering plant in the genus Neoregelia. This species is endemic to Venezuela.

References

cathcartii
Flora of Venezuela